The Turnmills building was a warehouse originally on the corner of Turnmill Street and Clerkenwell Road in the London Borough of Islington. It became a bar in the 1980s, then a nightclub. The club closed in 2008 and the building was later demolished, replaced with an office building.

History
The Victorian building opened in 1886 and was originally used as a warehouse and stables by the Great Northern Railway Company. The building later became a warehouse for Booth's Dry Gin distillery before changing hands in 1985 and becoming a bar. The Clerkenwell area was well known for its gin distilleries during the Victorian era. Gordon's Gin distillery was originally sited in Goswell Road/Moreland Street, EC1, not far from Turnmills.

In a bid to try to save the building from demolition, various objections were put forward to Islington Council. William Palin, secretary of Save Britain's Heritage, said that "It may not be as architecturally stunning as the Sessions House across the road but it’s a really good-quality commercial and industrial building. It’s a good example of an old building that’s been successfully re-used in a number of ways."

Although English Heritage argued that the building possessed historic and aesthetic value, the building was finally deemed not to be of considerable significance to be saved from the wrecking ball. The building finally closed on 24 March 2008.

Club
In 1985 John Newman purchased the lease on the building and opened a bar/restaurant on the site. In 1990, the venue evolved into a nightclub. The first successful club night held at Turnmills was Xanadu, run and co-hosted by London club promoters Robert Pereno and Laurence Malice.

The venue was the first to obtain a 24-hour dance licence in the United Kingdom, spearheading the move to all-night clubbing in the 1990s and became the home of several club nights including Trade, the first legal after-hours club in Britain.

Soon after Turnmills became a nightclub venue, the small original sound system had to be rapidly improved to cope with the tough demands being made of it. An air cooled, single colour laser was also installed to complement the dance floor.
A small video clip of Turnmills dance floor appeared in the 1993 video 'Trance Vision Dance Volume 1' to accompany the 11th track on the video 'Let's Rock' by E. Trax.

Club nights

Thursday nights
 Essence.  (Autumn/winter 1992/3)  Mostly DJs from the Bedlam free sound system, with the Liberator crew (Aaron, Julian and Chris) as regulars with guests including Aztek and Murph.  Playing London underground pure acid and hard trance.

Friday nights
 The Gallery (in-house event) playing  progressive house, trance and techno.

Saturday nights
 Xanadu - co-hosted and run by Robert Pereno & Laurence Malice
 Heavenly Social
 Trade (1990–2002 weekly, actually opened 4am Sunday Mornings) — hosted and run by Laurence Malice. 
 Together
 Smartie Partie (2003–March 2008), monthly resident. Was suspended indefinitely in 2008 following a legal dispute with Nestlé over use of the trademark "Smarties".
City Loud (3rd Saturday of each month) — House music.
Roger Sanchez presents Release Yourself (various parties, 2002–2007)
Elements (2001)
Roach (2002–2003), Tom Stephan hosted a monthly deep & tech session.

Sunday nights
 FF (1989–1996)
 Warriors (1996–1997) Hard House Techno Club originally run by Buffalo, Spike, Taz and DJ Lord Kaos (Nursie)
 Melt (1997 - 1999) Techno, Nu-Nrg Club.
 Habit (2000 - 2001)

Monday nights
The Well (1998):  Progressive trance music.

Closure 
On 24 January 2008, Danny Newman announced the building would close on 23 March 2008 as a clubbing venue, due to the expiry of the lease on the building.
The building was later demolished and a new office building (despite objections) was built in its place. Publicis Sapient are now located in the new building.

See also

List of electronic dance music venues
 Afterhour clubs
Superclub

References

External links
Official website

Nightclubs in London
Buildings and structures in the London Borough of Islington
Music venues in London
Defunct nightclubs in the United Kingdom
Electronic dance music venues
Farringdon, London